This is a list of airlines currently operating in Niger:

See also
List of defunct airlines of Niger
List of airports in Niger
List of companies based in Niger

Niger
Airlines
Airlines
Niger